Uwe Jacobsen (born 22 September 1940 in Aschersleben) is a German former freestyle swimmer who competed in the 1960 Summer Olympics and in the 1964 Summer Olympics.

References

1940 births
Living people
German male freestyle swimmers
Olympic swimmers of the United Team of Germany
Swimmers at the 1960 Summer Olympics
Swimmers at the 1964 Summer Olympics
Olympic silver medalists for the United Team of Germany
Medalists at the 1964 Summer Olympics
Olympic silver medalists in swimming
People from Aschersleben
Sportspeople from Saxony-Anhalt